Jaden Hendrikse (born 23 March 2000) is a South African professional rugby union player for the  in Super Rugby Unlocked and the Sharks (Currie Cup) in the Currie Cup. His regular position is scrum-half.

Hendrikse was named in the  squad for the Super Rugby Unlocked competition.

References

External links
 

South African rugby union players
2000 births
Living people
Rugby union scrum-halves
Sharks (Currie Cup) players
Sharks (rugby union) players
South Africa international rugby union players
Rugby union players from the Eastern Cape